UPMC Kildare Hospital, also called Clane Hospital, is a private hospital located in Clane, County Kildare, Ireland. It is accredited by CHKS.

History
The hospital was founded in October 1985 by Andrew Rynne, an Irish surgeon and the chairperson of the Irish Family Planning Association, and the Republic of Ireland's first vasectomy specialist.

A controversy in its history was the use of defective Poly Implant Prothèse breast implants prior to 2012.

Services
Clane General offers urology, ENT, gynaecology, orthopaedic surgery, dental surgery, cataract surgery, endoscopy, dermatology and plastic surgery. Outpatient facilities include diagnostic imaging, physiotherapy, a fertility clinic and cardiology.

UPMC Group bought Clane Hospital in 2019.

References

External links

Hospital
Buildings and structures in County Kildare
Hospitals in County Kildare
Hospital buildings completed in 1985
Hospitals established in 1985
1985 establishments in Ireland
Private hospitals in the Republic of Ireland
University of Pittsburgh Medical Center
20th-century architecture in the Republic of Ireland